James Andrew Byrnes (born May 22, 1983) is a Canadian rower and Olympic gold medallist. He was born in Toronto, Ontario and raised in Ithaca, New York. Byrnes is a 2005 graduate of Bates College in Maine, where he rowed for the Bates Rowing Team and earned a master's degree in engineering from the University of Pennsylvania in 2006.

He has won four World Rowing Championships medals, a bronze in 2006 in the men's coxed pairs with Derek O'Farrell and Brian Price; and a gold in 2007 in the men's eights, a silver in 2009 in Poznan, Poland in the men's eight and a bronze in Bled, Slovenia in 2011 in the men's eight.

He won a gold medal at the 2008 Summer Olympics in the men's eights with Ben Rutledge, Kyle Hamilton, Malcolm Howard, Adam Kreek, Kevin Light, Dominic Sieterle, Jake Wetzel and cox Brian Price.

He won a silver medal at the 2012 Summer Olympics in the men's eight. His teammates included Malcolm Howard and Brian Price, who he won gold with in 2008. The other six were Gabriel Bergen, Jeremiah Brown, Will Crothers, Douglas Csima, Robert Gibson and Conlin McCabe.

References

External links
 
 
 
 
 

1983 births
Living people
Canadian male rowers
Olympic rowers of Canada
Olympic gold medalists for Canada
Rowers from Toronto
Rowers at the 2004 Summer Olympics
Rowers at the 2008 Summer Olympics
Rowers at the 2012 Summer Olympics
Bates College alumni
Olympic medalists in rowing
Olympic silver medalists for Canada
Medalists at the 2012 Summer Olympics
Medalists at the 2008 Summer Olympics
Sportspeople from Ithaca, New York
University of Pennsylvania School of Engineering and Applied Science alumni
Canadian emigrants to the United States
World Rowing Championships medalists for Canada
Ithaca High School (Ithaca, New York) alumni